Calcium oxide (CaO), commonly known as quicklime or burnt lime, is a widely used chemical compound. It is a white, caustic, alkaline, crystalline solid at room temperature. The broadly used term "lime" connotes calcium-containing inorganic materials, in which carbonates, oxides and hydroxides of calcium, silicon, magnesium, aluminium, and iron predominate. By contrast, quicklime  specifically applies to the single chemical compound calcium oxide. Calcium oxide that survives processing without reacting in building products such as cement is called free lime.

Quicklime is relatively inexpensive. Both it and the chemical derivative calcium hydroxide (of which quicklime is the base anhydride) are important commodity chemicals.

Preparation
Calcium oxide is usually made by the thermal decomposition of materials, such as limestone or seashells, that contain calcium carbonate (CaCO3; mineral calcite) in a lime kiln. This is accomplished by heating the material to above , a process called calcination or lime-burning, to liberate a molecule of carbon dioxide (CO2), leaving quicklime behind. This is also one of the few chemical reactions known in prehistoric times.
 CaCO3(s) → CaO(s) + CO2(g)

The quicklime is not stable and, when cooled, will spontaneously react with CO2 from the air until, after enough time, it will be completely converted back to calcium carbonate unless slaked with water to set as lime plaster or lime mortar.

Annual worldwide production of quicklime is around 283 million tonnes. China is by far the world's largest producer, with a total of around 170 million tonnes per year. The United States is the next largest, with around 20 million tonnes per year.

Approximately 1.8t of limestone is required per 1.0t of quicklime. Quicklime has a high affinity for water and is a more efficient desiccant than silica gel. The reaction of quicklime with water is associated with an increase in volume by a factor of at least 2.5.

Uses

 The major use of quicklime is in the basic oxygen steelmaking (BOS) process. The quicklime neutralizes the acidic oxides, SiO2, Al2O3, and Fe2O3, to produce a basic molten slag.
 Ground quicklime is used in the production of aerated concrete blocks, with densities of ca. .
 Quicklime and hydrated lime can considerably increase the load carrying capacity of clay-containing soils. They do this by reacting with finely divided silica and alumina to produce calcium silicates and aluminates, which possess cementing properties.
 Small quantities of quicklime are used in other processes; e.g., the production of glass, calcium aluminate cement, and organic chemicals.
 Heat: Quicklime releases thermal energy by the formation of the hydrate, calcium hydroxide, by the following equation:
CaO (s) + H2O (l)  Ca(OH)2 (aq) (ΔHr = −63.7kJ/mol of CaO)
 As it hydrates, an exothermic reaction results and the solid puffs up. The hydrate can be reconverted to quicklime by removing the water by heating it to redness to reverse the hydration reaction. This process can be used to provide a convenient portable source of heat, as for on-the-spot food warming in a self-heating can, cooking, and heating water without open flames. Several companies sell cooking kits using this heating method.
 It is known as a food additive to the FAO as an acidity regulator, a flour treatment agent and as a leavener. It has E number E529.
This form of illumination is known as a limelight, and was used broadly in theatrical productions before the invention of electric lighting.
 Cement: Calcium oxide is a key ingredient for the process of making cement.
 As a cheap and widely available alkali. About 50% of the total quicklime production is converted to calcium hydroxide before use. Both quick- and hydrated lime are used in the treatment of drinking water.
 Petroleum industry: Water detection pastes contain a mix of calcium oxide and phenolphthalein. Should this paste come into contact with water in a fuel storage tank, the CaO reacts with the water to form calcium hydroxide. Calcium hydroxide has a high enough pH to turn the phenolphthalein a vivid purplish-pink color, thus indicating the presence of water.
 Paper: Calcium oxide is used to regenerate sodium hydroxide from sodium carbonate in the chemical recovery at Kraft pulp mills.
 Plaster: There is archeological evidence that Pre-Pottery Neolithic B humans used limestone-based plaster for flooring and other uses. Such Lime-ash floor remained in use until the late nineteenth century.
 Chemical or power production: Solid sprays or slurries of calcium oxide can be used to remove sulfur dioxide from exhaust streams in a process called flue-gas desulfurization.
 Mining: Compressed lime cartridges exploit the exothermic properties of quicklime to break rock. A shot hole is drilled into the rock in the usual way and a sealed cartridge of quicklime is placed within and tamped. A quantity of water is then injected into the cartridge and the resulting release of steam, together with the greater volume of the residual hydrated solid, breaks the rock apart. The method does not work if the rock is particularly hard.
 Disposal of corpses: Historically, it was mistakenly believed that quicklime was efficacious in accelerating the decomposition of corpses. The application of quicklime can, in fact, promote preservation. Quicklime can aid in eradicating the stench of decomposition, which may have led people to the erroneous conclusion.
 It has been determined that the durability of ancient Roman concrete is attributed in part to the use of quicklime as an ingredient. Combined with hot mixing, the quicklime creates macrosized lime clasts with a characteristically brittle nano-particle architecture. As cracks form in the concrete they preferentially pass through the structurally weaker lime clasts, fracturing them. When water enters these cracks it creates a calcium-saturated solution which can recrystallize as calcium carbonate, quickly filling the crack.

Weapon
In 80 BC, the Roman general Sertorius deployed choking clouds of caustic lime powder to defeat the Characitani of Hispania, who had taken refuge in inaccessible caves. A similar dust was used in China to quell an armed peasant revolt in 178 AD, when lime chariots equipped with bellows blew limestone powder into the crowds.

Quicklime is also thought to have been a component of Greek fire. Upon contact with water, quicklime would increase its temperature above  and ignite the fuel.

David Hume, in his History of England, recounts that early in the reign of Henry III, the English Navy destroyed an invading French fleet by blinding the enemy fleet with quicklime. Quicklime may have been used in medieval naval warfare – up to the use of "lime-mortars" to throw it at the enemy ships.

Substitutes
Limestone is a substitute for lime in many applications, which include agriculture, fluxing, and sulfur removal. Limestone, which contains less reactive material, is slower to react and may have other disadvantages compared with lime, depending on the application; however, limestone is considerably less expensive than lime. Calcined gypsum is an alternative material in industrial plasters and mortars. Cement, cement kiln dust, fly ash, and lime kiln dust are potential substitutes for some construction uses of lime. Magnesium hydroxide is a substitute for lime in pH control, and magnesium oxide is a substitute for dolomitic lime as a flux in steelmaking.

Safety 
Because of vigorous reaction of quicklime with water, quicklime causes severe irritation when inhaled or placed in contact with moist skin or eyes. Inhalation may cause coughing, sneezing, and labored breathing. It may then evolve into burns with perforation of the nasal septum, abdominal pain, nausea and vomiting. Although quicklime is not considered a fire hazard, its reaction with water can release enough heat to ignite combustible materials.

Mineral
Calcium oxide is also a separate mineral species (with the unit formula CaO), named 'Lime'. It has an isometric crystal system, and can form a solid solution series with monteponite. The crystal is brittle, pyrometamorphic, and is unstable in moist air, quickly turning into portlandite (Ca(OH)2).

References

External links

 Lime Statistics & Information from the United States Geological Survey
 Factors Affecting the Quality of Quicklime
 American Scientist (discussion of 14C dating of mortar)
 Chemical of the Week – Lime
 Material Safety Data Sheet
 CDC – NIOSH Pocket Guide to Chemical Hazards

Alchemical substances
Bases (chemistry)
Calcium compounds
Cement
Dehydrating agents
Desiccants
Disinfectants
E-number additives
Limestone
Rock salt crystal structure
Oxides